This is a complete list of releases from Welsh rock band The Automatic, including albums, extended plays, singles and music videos.

Discography

Studio albums

Singles

Demos
Studio

EPs
Studio

Live

DVD

Covers

Remixes

Live releases

References

Automatic, The
Rock music group discographies